Sar Molki-ye Qanat-e Now (also Romanized as Sar Molkī-ye Qanāt-e Now; also known as Qanāt-e Now, Qanāt-e Now-e Sar Molkī, and Sar Molkī) is a village in Khorrami Rural District, in the Central District of Khorrambid County, Fars Province, Iran. At the 2006 census, its population was 56, in 15 families.

References 

Populated places in Khorrambid County